Gupta Brothers is an Indian comedy drama television series that aired from 5 October 2020 to 26 January 2021 on Star Bharat. Produced by Mahesh Pandey, it stars Parineeta Borthakur, Hiten Tejwani, Aakash Mukherjee, Satya Tiwari and Meet Mukhi. This show was the first official Hindi television remake of Tamil television series Pandian Stores by Star India and went off-air the next day of the premier of second  Hindi language remake of Pandian Stores, Pandya Store.

Plot
The show opens with a family of four bachelor brothers Shiv, Alok, Veeru and Rajat living in Banaras. They are well-versed in everything, from doing all household chores to managing business in a local grocery store. Hence, the four brothers are commonly referred to as Sarvagun Sampann Gupta Brothers in their neighborhood. The four brothers are self-reliant that they feel a woman is absolutely unnecessary in their lives. Hence, they decide to remain unmarried. However, when Ganga creates a fake identity of Mridula Roy and enters into the lives of Gupta Brothers, their worlds turn upside-down. All the four brothers try to get rid of her using all possible means to find Ganga's truth. While trying to do that, Shiv discovers Ganga's true identity, being an orphan and develops a soft corner for her, also forgiving in spite of her delinquent deeds against the brothers. Ganga is amazed by Shiv's kindness and instantly takes a likeness for him, which soon develops into love. However, Shiv unaware of Ganga's feelings decides to get her married to another man, to which Ganga accepts brokenheartedly. On the day of wedding, the bride-groom elopes, so Shiv marries Ganga to save her honor. Shiv and Ganga's marriage leave Alok, Veeru and Rajat shattered and also develop a rift with Shiv. They decide never to accept Ganga as their brother's wife. Later, it is revealed that Shiv and Ganga's marriage was an evil ploy made by Amba against the Gupta brothers. She continues to provoke Alok, Veeru and Rajat against Shiv and Ganga by revealing that they are Shiv's step-brothers, instill the idea of partition and constantly plotting against the brothers. But, Ganga uncovers Amba's complete truth and vows to protect her family. By risking her love and marriage, Ganga reveals everything to Shiv. Shiv is shocked to learn Amba's truth, breaks all ties with her and starts reciprocating Ganga's feelings seeing her goodness. Meanwhile, even Rajat gets moved by Ganga's kindness and accepts her, while Alok and Veeru still hate her. Amba dejected of Shiv learning the truth from Ganga, decides to kill Ganga. Unfortunately, Alok, Veeru and Rajat fall prey of her evil plan. Ganga puts her life at stake and saves all the three of them. This moves both Alok and Veeru, making them realize that they had been wrong about her all the while. Finally, Shiv's brothers accept Ganga and name her as their Bhabhi-maa.

15 days later
Alok, Veeru and Rajat arrange Shiv and Ganga's nuptial night, where Ganga decides that they will not consider about their own family until Shiv's brothers, whom Ganga now considers as her own children are completely settled. Shiv is taken aback, but respecting Ganga's bold decision accepts and start their life together.

6 months later
The Gupta family is now a happy family with the three younger Gupta brothers looking upon Shiv and Ganga as their parents. During a festive moment, Shiv and Ganga notice Alok and Jaya closeness and doubt on their relation. Upon demand, Jaya reveals that she has been in love with Alok since childhood and also believes that Alok who is a changed man now, is reciprocating her feelings. This leads to Shiv and Ganga, misunderstand that Alok and Jaya love each other. Though initially reluctant, Shiv decides to marry off Alok and Jaya for his brother's happiness, which is when, it is revealed that Alok loves another girl, Aditi, the daughter of one of their rich dealers Bansal. Upon learning more about Bansal, Alok broken-heartedly decides to marry Jaya. On the other hand, he breaks-up with Aditi, while lying to her that his love was fake. On the day of Alok and Jaya's marriage, Aditi learns the truth and also realizes that her father was the master-plan behind breaking hers and Alok's relationship. Aditi decides to win back Alok. She elopes from her house and emotionally blackmails Alok that she would give up her life if he wouldn't marry her. Helpless, Alok marries Aditi, shattering Jaya and her family. To secure Jaya's future, Ganga asks Veeru to marry Jaya, to which both oppose as both of them have always hated each other. However, in the end, for the sake of the happiness of their families, Veeru and Jaya agree to marry each other. Thus, Alok marries Aditi, while Veeru marries Jaya.

After Aditi–Alok and Veeru–Jaya's marriage, Ganga and Shiv struggle to keep their family united as constant issues crop in between Aditi and Jaya, because Aditi is always insecure about Jaya's presence. Aditi also has difficulty to adjust with the middle-class conditions of the family as she has always led a luxurious life till then. Veeru and Jaya always quarrel with each other due to their differences. Ganga and Shiv strive hard to keep the unity of the family together, however Amba strives to divide the Gupta family.

Thus, Amba instigates Bansal, who wants his daughter and son–in–law, to live with him, Aditi–Alok, against the Gupta family. Amba herself was using Bansal as she wants her daughter, Jaya, to live a queen's life in Gupta family. Provoked by Amba, Bansal stops all his supplies to Gupta & Sons grocery store. This causes a major loss for the Guptas and Shiv decides to get help from acquaintances of Mirzapur. In Shiv's Absence, when a man named Mishra, who is in fact of Amba, offers help to the Gupta family. Alok retracts from accepting the offer. However, Veeru, in order to help his family and to prove himself in front of his wife, Jaya, who always considers him to be good-for-nothing, accepts Mishra's offer going against Alok.

Amba's plan succeeds with the Health Inspectors inspecting the stale and expired products in Gupta & Sons grocery store and thus leading to seal the store. The Guptas are devastated and things go more downhill with the police coming to arrest Alok for the Foodborne illness caused by the stale and expired products of Gupta & Sons. Shiv and Veeru try to save Alok, by getting arrested instead of him. Nevertheless, Alok stops his brothers and gets arrested taking the entire responsibility of Foodborne illness upon himself. While Shiv–Veeru tries to release Alok through law, Ganga reaches Bansal for help. Bansal puts forth a condition that he will help Ganga, in return of Aditi–Alok. Ganga is crossed to learn Bansal's perspectives of considering family–relations as business. Ganga denies to ever bid her family in return of anything in this world. As Ganga leaves, Bansal realizes that Aditi had overheard his and Ganga's entire conversation. Bansal tries to emotionally blackmail his daughter once again. But, this time Aditi confronts her father for all his evil acts against her (Gupta) family and vows that she will break all ties with her father if he ever tries to plot against her family.

Later, Ganga, Shiv and Veeru make-up with the Foodborne illness victims' families and help Alok get released from jail. At the same time, Jaya too catches Mishra proving the innocence of the Guptas in the case of Foodborne illness. The whole Gupta family rejoice over surpassing the great trouble in their family. However, things are still unstable between Aditi–Jaya with Jaya misunderstanding the main culprit behind all the scams in Gupta family to be Bansal (when it is her mother, Amba); while Aditi is always insecure with Alok-Jaya's proximity. Tensions also continue to prevail between Veeru–Jaya. However, Aditi, aware of her father's misdeeds, accepts the Gupta family more and is able to have a better cordial relationship with everyone in the family, except for Jaya.

Ganga and Shiv decide to send the newly-weds, Aditi–Alok and Veeru–Jaya for honeymoon. During their honeymoon, Veeru–Jaya had a huge brawl in the hotel, with Jaya leaving the room saddened and annoyed. She is about to meet with an accident, when Alok saves her and promises Jaya that he will be always at her side as a friend. Unfortunately, Aditi watches it and fumes with jealousy. She calls Veeru and questions his wife's character to which Veeru's stays dumb. In the room, Veeru assures, he trusts Jaya, having known of her friendship with Alok since childhood. This betters the matters between Veeru–Jaya a bit. While, on the other side, Aditi confesses to Alok, how much insecure she is about his and Jaya's relation and wants Alok to prove his loyalty to her.

In Banaras, Ganga–Shiv are called for a Baby shower ceremony, where Ganga is criticized for being childless. However, Rajat retaliates to the criticisms, by calling Ganga Bhabhi-maa and affirming that Ganga is also his mother. Later, Ganga-Shiv decide to renovate and enlarge their house for the comfort of the newly-weds. During the puja of house–renovation, Aditi–Alok and Veeru–Jaya surprise everyone with their return. The Gupta family is overjoyed when Aditi tells them she is pregnant. Everyone is happy for Aditi except for Jaya, who feels dejected on being ignored by Aditi and her dejection is increased by Amba poisoning her mind more. Jaya vents out her frustration on Veeru, saying her life is destroyed by marrying him. Veeru is heart–broken by Jaya's words and decides to divorce her for her betterment. While on the other hand, Amba tries to kill Aditi's unborn child, by poisoning her food.

Cast

Main
 Parineeta Borthakur as Ganga Gupta – Shiv's wife; Alok, Veeru and Rajat's mother-figure (2020–2021)<ref>{{Cite web|url=https://timesofindia.indiatimes.com/tv/news/hindi/parineeta-borthakur-i-hope-people-like-my-character-in-gupta-brothers-chaar-kunware-from-ganga-kinaare/articleshow/78553685.cms|title=Parineeta Borthakur: I hope people like my character in 'Gupta Brothers: Chaar Kunware from Ganga Kinaare|website=The Times of India|language=en|access-date=2020-10-08}}</ref>
 Hiten Tejwani as Shiv Gupta – Narayan and Lakshmi's eldest son- eldest brother of Alok,Veeru,and Rajat and father figure also.Husband of ganga.(2020–2021) 
 Akash Mukherjee as Alok Gupta – Narayan and Lakshmi 's second son-younger brother of Shiv,elder brother of Veeru,and Rajat.Husband of Aditi.2020–2021)
 Aishwarya Raj Bhakuni as Aditi Bansal Gupta – Bansal's daughter; Alok's wife (2020–2021)
 Satya Tiwari as Veeru Gupta – Narayan and Lakshmi's third son,- younger brother of Shiv,and Alok,elder brother of Rajat.Husband of Jaya.(2020–2021)
 Sonal Vengurlekar as Jaya Satya Prakash Gupta – Satya Prakash and Amba's daughter; Alok's ex-fiancé; Veeru's wife (2020–2021)
 Meet Mukhi as Rajat Gupta – Narayan and Lakshmi's youngest son-youngest brother of Shiv,Alok,and Veeru.(2020–2021)

Recurring
 Rinku Dhawan as Amba Satya Prakash – Satya Prakash's wife; Jaya's mother (2020–2021) 
 Deepak Dutta as Satya Prakash – Amba's husband; Jaya's father (2020–2021)
 Darpan Shrivastava as Bansal – Aditi's father (2020–2021)
 Aditi Deshpande as Lakshmi Gupta – Narayan's second wife; Alok, Veeru and Rajat's mother; Shiv's step-mother (2020)
 Jairoop Jeevan as Narayan Gupta – Owner of Gupta & Sons grocery store; Gayatri and Lakshmi's husband; Shiv, Alok, Veeru and Rajat's father (2020–2021) (Dead)
Sanjay Pandey as Radhe Shyam Rasiya aka John Jani Janardhan – Gupta brothers' former rival (2020)
Surya Rao as Inspector Bharat Videshi (2020)
Roma Navani as Kamini's mother (2020)
Bhoomika Mirchandani as Kamini – Alok's fake lover and ex-fiancé (2020)

 Production 
 Development 
In January 2020, StarPlus planned an official Hindi remake of Star Vijay's Tamil series Pandian Stores to be produced by Mahesh Pandey Productions under the title Khandaan.  With a change in title to Hum– Ek Makaan Ek Dukaan, filming began in February 2020 with portions shot in Varanasi but, shooting was halted in March 2020 due to the COVID-19 pandemic. After the lockdown, the series was shifted to Star Bharat. The channel changed its programming genre to comedy from drama and the plot was changed. Later, filming began in July 2020 post-COVID break and the show was aired with the title Gupta Brothers - Chaar Kunware From Ganga Kinaare from 5 October 2020, as a dramedy series to suit Star Bharat's comedy genre.

In December 2020, StarPlus announced another Hindi remake of Pandian Stores titled Pandya Store'' produced by Sphere Origins which premiered on 25 January 2021.

With the launch of the second official Hindi remake of Pandian Stores; the first official Hindi remake Gupta Brothers was announced to go off-air on 5 February. But, later, Gupta Brothers went off-air abruptly on 26 January, earlier than the announced date.

Release
The first promo of the series was released on 24 September 2020, featuring the four Gupta Brothers, Hiten Tejwani, Aakash Mukherjee, Satya Tiwari and Meet Mukhi.

The next promo featuring the entry of Parineeta Borthakur as Mridula Roy was released on 7 October 2020.

Cancellation
The show was in second position of the channel Star Bharat's overall show rankings.

However, with the premiering of second Hindi remake of Pandian Stores on 25 January 2021, the first official remake was hastily off-aired on 26 January 2021.

References

External links
 

Indian drama television series
Indian television soap operas
Hindi-language television shows
2020 Indian television series debuts
2021 Indian television series endings
Star Bharat original programming
Television shows set in Uttar Pradesh
Hindi-language television series based on Tamil-language television series